The province of Tarlac held local elections on Monday, May 13, 2013, as a part of the 2013 Philippine general election. Voters selected candidates for all local positions: a town mayor, vice mayor and town councilors, as well as members of the Sangguniang Panlalawigan, the vice-governor, governor and representatives for the three districts of Tarlac.

Provincial elections
The candidates for governor and vice governor with the highest number of votes wins the seat; they are voted separately, therefore, they may be of different parties when elected.

Gubernatorial election
Total number of Voters who actually voted is 410,282

Parties are as stated in their certificate of candidacies.

Vice-gubernatorial election
Enrique Cojuangco Jr. is running unopposed

Congressional elections
Each of Tarlac's three legislative districts will elect each representative to the House of Representatives. The candidate with the highest number of votes wins the seat.

1st District
Incumbent Enrique Cojuangco is running unopposed.

2nd District
Susan Sulit is the incumbent.

3rd District

Provincial Board elections
All 3 Districts of Tarlac will elect Sangguniang Panlalawigan or provincial board members.  Election is via plurality-at-large voting.

1st District

2nd District

3rd District

References

External links
COMELEC - Official website of the Philippine Commission on Elections (COMELEC)
NAMFREL - Official website of National Movement for Free Elections (NAMFREL)
PPCRV - Official website of the Parish Pastoral Council for Responsible Voting (PPCRV)

Elections in Tarlac
2013 Philippine local elections